Night is a new-school folk band from Nepal. The band is known for its use of traditional Nepali instruments in its songs. It aims to reintroduce the traditional instruments of Nepal to the modern generation of Nepali-speaking audience.

Members 
Current members
 Agrim Lama (Tungna) 
 Jason Kunwar (Vocailst)
 Niraj Shakya (Manager)
 Shiva Kumari Khatri (Paluwa)
 Sudhir Acharya (Percussion)
 Sugama Gautam (Vocalist)

Formation 
Jason Kunwar alongside Ranav Adhikari and Niraj Shakya formed Night as a metal band in 2006. But over the time, their interest shifted to Nepali folk instruments and folk music and they became a folk music band.

Folk music and success 
The band released singles initially, which became highly popular in Nepal. It released its first album, Ani Ukali Sangai Orali in 2014, second album Jhalka Raya Buka in August 2017 and its third album Ramite- The Music Volume 1 in 2019. The band has established a solid fan base ranging from metalheads to the common man. Some of the band members have composed music for Nepali films such as Chhadke, Jhola and Suntali.

Live performances 
Night has performed at the Shambala Festival in August 2015 and 2019, BBC Radio 3 in April 2016 and WOMEX showcase in October 2017, Sommarscen Malmo, Ethno Krakow at 2018. They had also collaborated with A.R. Rahman on the occasion of International Peace Day to produce a musical tribute. Apart from Nepal, Night had also performed in many other countries.

Style 
The music of Night is folk-based and echoes the pains of the economically marginalized sections of the society. The band members visit various parts of Nepal and collect folk tunes and instruments. Night aims to promote rare traditional musical instruments through its short documentary series Know Your Instruments on its YouTube channel and live concerts. Some of the Nepali musical instruments used by Night are Sarangi, Piwnacha, Nagara (drums), Dhimay (drums), Paluwa (leaf), Tungna and Flute.

Discography
Ani Ukali Sangai Orali 

Release date: 27 December 2014

Jhalka Raya Buka 

Release date: 26 August 2017

Ramite - The Music, Volume 1 

Release date: 13 April 2019

References

External links
Official Facebook page
Night YouTube Channel
Night on Kripa Unplugged
Night on WOMEX 17 Showcase

Nepalese musical groups
Nepalese music
Musical groups from Kathmandu